The Winterton Lady is the skeleton of a Romano-British woman discovered in Winterton, North Lincolnshire, England. She was buried in a limestone sarcophagus, which was discovered during a road-widening scheme in 1968.

Her skeleton and the sarcophagus, along with a model of her facial reconstruction, are on display in North Lincolnshire Museum.

See also
Winterton Roman villa

References

People from Lincolnshire
Burials in Lincolnshire
1968 archaeological discoveries
1968 in England
Winterton, Lincolnshire
Ancient Romans in Britain
Collections of North Lincolnshire Museum